Central Huijin Investment Co., Ltd. is a Chinese investment company owned by the government of the People's Republic of China. Established in 2003, it became a wholly-owned subsidiary of China Investment Corporation, with its own Board of Directors and Board of Supervisors. Central Huijin's principal shareholder rights are exercised on behalf of the State Council. Central Huijin is an organization by which the Chinese government can act as a shareholder for the "big four" state-owned banks, thereby improving corporate governance and initiating reforms of the banking industry.

History
Central Huijin Investment was acquired from the State Administration of Foreign Exchange by the China Investment Corporation for roughly $67 billion.

Governance

Board of Directors
Ding Xuedong (Chairman & CEO)
Li Jiange (Vice Chairman)
Bai Tao (Executive Director and President)

Subsidiaries

 Central Huijin Asset Management (100%)
China Jianyin Investment (100%)
 China Everbright Group
 Everbright Securities
 China Everbright Limited
 China Everbright International
 China Everbright Bank
 China Galaxy Securities
 China International Capital Corporation
 China Investment Securities

Investments

As of 31 December 2020, Central Huijin held shares in 17 financial institutions: China Development Bank, Industrial and Commercial Bank of China, Agricultural Bank of China, Bank of China, China Construction Bank, China Everbright Group, Hengfeng Bank, China Export & Credit Insurance Corporation, China Reinsurance (Group) Corporation, New China Life Insurance Co., China Jianyin Investment Ltd., China Galaxy Financial Holdings Co. Ltd., Shenwan Hongyuan, China International Capital Corporation, China Securities, China Galaxy Asset Management Co. Ltd., and Guotai Junan Investment Management Co. Ltd.

It owns majority stakes in all big four Chinese banks (Bank of China, Industrial and Commercial Bank of China, China Construction Bank, and Agricultural Bank of China), but does not own shares in the smaller joint-stock commercial banks which are largely owned by local governments.

 China Pacific Insurance Group (1.22%)
 New China Life Insurance (32.25%)
 Ping An Insurance (2.65%)
 CSC Financial (33.29%)

References

External links 

 Central Huijin Investment

China Investment Corporation
Investment companies of China
Sovereign wealth funds
Companies based in Beijing
Financial services companies established in 2003
2003 establishments in China